This is a list of acronyms and other initialisms used in laser physics and laser applications.

A

AOM – acousto-optic modulator
AOPDF – acousto-optic programmable dispersive filter
APD – avalanche photodiode
APM – additive-pulse mode locking
ASE – amplified spontaneous emission
ATD – above threshold dissociation
ATI – above threshold ionization
AWG – arrayed waveguide grating

B

BPP – beam parameter product

C

CD-ROM – compact disc read-only memory
CEO – carrier-envelope offset
CEP – carrier-envelope phase
CPA – chirped-pulse amplification
CW – continuous wave
CWDM – coarse wavelength division multiplexing

D
DBR – distributed Bragg reflector
DCM – dispersion-compensation module or double-chirped mirror
DFB laser – distributed feedback laser
DFG – difference-frequency generation
DIAL – differential absorption LIDAR
DOG – double optical gating
DOS – density of states
DPSS – diode pumped solid state
DWDM – dense wavelength division multiplexing

E
ECDL – external cavity diode laser
EDC – electronic dispersion compensation
EDFA – erbium-doped fiber amplifier
Er:YAG – erbium-doped yttrium aluminium garnet, Er:Y3Al5O12
EOM – electro-optic modulator
ESA – excited state absorption

F
FEL – free electron laser
FREAG – frequency-resolved electro-absorption gating
FROG – frequency-resolved optical gating
FROG-CRAB – frequency-resolved optical gating for complete reconstruction of attosecond bursts
FWM – four-wave mixing
FP – Fabry-Perot laser

G
GRENOUILLE – grating-eliminated no-nonsense observation of ultrafast incident laser light e-fields

H

HeNe – helium–neon laser
HHG – high harmonic generation

I
IR – infrared

K
KLM – Kerr-lens modelocking

L
LASEK – laser-assisted sub-epithelial keratectomy
LASER – light amplification by stimulated emission of radiation
LASIK – laser-assisted in situ keratomileusis (eye surgery)
LBO – lithium triborate
LiDAR – light detection and ranging
LLLT – low-level laser therapy

M
MASER – microwave amplification by stimulated emission of radiation
MIIPS – multiphoton intrapulse interference phase scan
MOPA  – master oscillator power amplifier

N
Nd:YAG – neodymium-doped yttrium aluminium garnet, Nd:Y3Al5O12
Nd:YCOB – neodymium-doped YCOB, YCa4O(BO3)3

O
OC – output coupler
OPO – optical parametric oscillator
OPA – optical parametric amplifier / optical parametric amplification
OPCPA – optical parametric chirped pulse amplification

P
 PI – population inversion

R
RABBIT – reconstruction of attosecond beating by interference of two-photon transitions
REMPI – resonance-enhanced multiphoton ionization

S
SHG – second harmonic generation
SLM – single longitudinal mode
SPIDER – spectral phase interferometry for direct electric-field reconstruction
SPM – self-phase modulation

T
TE – transverse electric mode
TEA – transverse electrical discharge in gas at atmospheric pressure
TEM – transverse electromagnetic mode
THG – third harmonic generation
Ti:Sapph – Ti-sapphire laser
TM – transverse magnetic mode

U
UV – ultraviolet

V
VCSEL – vertical cavity surface-emitting laser
VECSEL – vertical external cavity surface-emitting laser

W
WDM – wavelength division multiplexing

X
XPM – cross-phase modulation
XPW – cross-polarized wave generation

Y
YAG – yttrium aluminium garnet, Y3Al5O12
YAM – yttrium aluminium monoclinic
YAP – yttrium aluminium perovskite

acronyms
Laser